Kawas may refer to:

 Kawas (genus), an extinct seal genus
 Kawas (mythology), an Amis spiritual entity, and related terms
 Kawas, Pakistan, a town and union council, Balochistan province, Pakistan
 Kawas, Alabel, a barangay of Alabel, Sarangani, Philippines
 NTPC Kawas, a power plant in Surat, Gujarat, India

People with the surname
 Bassam Kawas (born 1969), Lebanese Olympic middle-distance runner
 Hiba Kawas (born 1972), Lebanese operatic soprano, composer, and academic
 Jeannette Kawas (1946–1995), murdered environmental activist from Honduras
 Samira Kawas, Lebanese producer and actress

See also
 Kavass, often spelled kawas or kawass: a type of Late Ottoman guard